David Young  is an American keyboardist, composer, and recording artist. He is most well known for producing the soundtracks to the Sega CD video games Sonic CD, Ecco: The Tides of Time, and The Amazing Spider-Man vs. The Kingpin.

Career with Sega
In 1993, Young began contributing audio and music to Sega video games. He was present for the formation of Sega Music Group and Sega Music Group Studios in San Francisco. Young was a frequent collaborator with composer/producer Spencer Nilsen, who was director of Sega Music Group at the time. He was involved in over a dozen different Sega titles from 1993–1996, composing, producing and engineering soundtracks for titles such as The Amazing Spider-Man vs. The Kingpin, Sonic CD, Ecco: The Tides of Time, Congo The Movie: The Lost City of Zinj, NBA Live, NHL Live, and Wild Woody, as well as many others.

Works

References

External links
 Official website

21st-century American composers
21st-century American keyboardists
American male composers
Living people
Video game composers
21st-century American male musicians
Year of birth missing (living people)